The Unadulterated Cat by Terry Pratchett, illustrated by Gray Jolliffe, is a book written to promote what Pratchett terms the 'Real Cat', a cat who urinates in the flowerbeds, rips up the furniture, and eats frogs, mice and sundry other small animals.  The opposite of the Real Cat is the 'Fizzy Keg Cat', a well-behaved and bland kind, as seen on cat food advertisements.
It was first published 1989 by Gollancz.

Translations
Автентичната котка (Bulgarian)
Nefalšovaná kočka (Czech)
De echte kat (Dutch)
Tosikissa ei kirppuja kiroile (Finnish)
Sacrés chats ! (French)
Die gemeine Hauskatze (German)
Az igazi macska: Kampány az igazi macskáért (Hungarian)
Il Gatto D.O.C. (Italian)
Kot w stanie czystym (Polish)
Кот без дураков (Russian)
Riktiga Katter bär inte Rosett (Swedish)

External links

L-Space

Books about cats
Comedy books
1989 books
Ethology
Terry Pratchett